University of Kigali (UoK) is a fully accredited and chartered university by the Government of Rwanda. UoK started its operations in October 2013.

Location
University of Kigali's temporary campus is located along KG 541 Street near the plush Kigali Heights in the central business district of Kigali, the capital and largest city in Rwanda. The geographical coordinates of the university campus are:01°57'03.0"S, 30°05'35.0"E (Latitude:-1.950833; Longitude:30.093056). The university operates a second campus in the Rwanda Social Security Bureau Building in the town of Ruhengeri, Musanze District, in the Northern Province of Rwanda.

Overview
University of Kigali  (UoK) currently has two campuses; the main campus known as The Kigali Campus and the upcountry campus known as The Musanze Campus. Total enrollment is approximately 8,000 students, with approximately 6,500 undergraduates and about 1,500 postgraduate students.

The university has international students from Nigeria, Burundi, Uganda, Kenya, South Sudan, Tanzania, China, Ivory Coast, Gabon, Ethiopia, Turkey, Central African Republic, Malawi, Sierra Leone, Angola, Republic of the Congo, Senegal and the Democratic Republic of the Congo.

Schools, Faculties and Institutes 
University of Kigali has the following Academic Units: 

 School of Law
 School of Business Management and Economics
 School of Computing and Information Technology
 School of Education
 School of Graduate Studies
 School of Professional and Executive Programmes 
 Center for Economic Governance and Leadership
 Center for Modern Languages

Academic Partnerships
University of Kigali (UoK) has academic partnerships with the following  universities: (a) University of Cape Town (b) Kenyatta University (c) Cambridge Institute for Sustainability Leadership (Southern Africa office) (d) Baden-Württemberg Cooperative State University (e) Symbiosis International University and (e) Strathmore University

Memberships and Accreditation
University of Kigali is a member of:
 The Sustainable Development Solutions Network
 The Association of Commonwealth Universities
 Association of Chartered Certified Accountants
 AIESEC

References

External links
Official Website

Kigali
Private universities and colleges
Universities in Rwanda
Educational institutions established in 2013
2013 establishments in Rwanda